Inside My Head is a two disc compilation album by musician Richard Marx, his tenth overall. It consists of songs from previous albums Emotional Remains and Sundown, new recordings of some of his biggest hits, as well as new material. The album features four new never before released songs: "Wouldn't Let Me Love You," "Like Heaven," "All Over Me," and "Scars." "Wouldn't Let You Love Me" was released May 21, 2012 as the lead single. The album itself was released June 1, 2012, exclusively in Europe.

Track listing
Disc 1
Had Enough (Marx/Daughtry/Wade) (3:48)
Wouldn't Let Me Love You (Marx/Rauch/Graves) (3:58)
Like Heaven (Marx/Wade) (3:18)
On The Inside (Marx/Daughtry/Kroeger) (3:15)
Through My Veins (Marx) (4:43)
Always On Your Mind (Marx/Scannell) (4:58)
Loved (Marx) (3:38)
Come Running (Marx/Waybill) (4:18)
All Over Me (Marx/Marlette/Smith/Hora/Craig/Benedict) (3:23)
Scars (Marx/Sayce) (3:07)
Done To Me (Marx) (3:47)
Over My Head (Marx) (3:56)
Part Of Me (Marx/Scannell) (4:14)

Disc 2
Don't Mean Nothing (Marx/Gaitsch) (4:43)
Should've Known Better (Marx) (4:28)
Endless Summer Nights (Marx) (4:28)
Keep Coming Back (Marx) (5:25)
Take This Heart (Marx) (4:04)
Hold On To The Nights (Marx) (5:14)
Angelia (Marx) (4:54)
Hazard (Marx) (4:59)
Too Late To Say Goodbye (Marx/Waybill) (4:47)
Satisfied (Marx) (3:21)
Right Here Waiting (Marx) (4:27)
When You Loved Me  (Marx/Scannell) (3:22)

2012 albums
Richard Marx albums
Frontiers Records albums
Albums produced by Richard Marx